The Center of the American Indian (CAI) was an intertribal, Native American-led museum in Oklahoma City, Oklahoma. It was housed in the second floor of the Kirkpatrick Center.

The Center of the American Indian produced a quarterly journal, The Storyteller. The CAI held workshops, language classes, and symposia, such as "We Always Had Plenty: Native Americans and the Bison" held in 1989.

CAI helped launch the Red Earth Festival in 1987. In 1992, the Center of the American Indian merged into Red Earth Inc., marking the end of its Native American leadership.

Personnel and supporters 
Mary Jo Watson (Seminole) served as director of the museum from 1984 to 1988. Baseball legend Allie Reynolds (Muscogee Creek) served as board chairman. Artists Benjamin Harjo Jr. (Absentee Shawnee/Seminole and Sharron Ahtone Harjo (Kiowa) volunteered at the museum and served on the board. Collector Arthur Silberman advised the museum.

Selection exhibitions and publications 
In 1990, the museum created a permanent exhibition Moving History: Native American Dance. Kiowa artists Sherman Chaddlesone (1947–2014) and Allie Chaddlesone exhibited at CAI.

Changing exhibitions, included:
 Kachin-Tihus: Those Who Sit with the People (1991) with catalog
 Moving History: Evolution of the Powwow (1991) with catalog by Dennis Zotigh (Kiowa)
 Songs of Indian Territory: Native American Music Traditions (1989) with catalog and cassette tape by Willie Smyth
 Children of Early America (1987) with catalog by Daniel C. Swan
 Big War/Little War: Oklahoma Indians in the Civil War, 1861–1865 (1985) with catalog
 Making Medicine: Ledger Drawing Art from Fort Marion (1984) with catalog, celebrating the ledger art of St. David Pendleton Oakerhater (Southern Cheyenne, c. 1847–1931).
 Full Blooded (1984), solo exhibition of work by Edgar Heap of Birds (Southern Cheyenne)

References 

Art museums and galleries in Oklahoma
Defunct art museums and galleries in the United States
Museums in Oklahoma City
Defunct museums in Oklahoma
Native American museums in Oklahoma
Museums established in 1978
Museums disestablished in 1992
Native Americans in Oklahoma City